The Masjed Soleyman oil field is an oil field located in Masjed Soleyman, Khuzestan Province, Iran and in the north of Ahvaz City. It was the first oil field discovered in Middle East. The field is a mature super-giant, which produces primarily from the prolific Oligocene Asmari horizons, a formation which underpins Iranian crude oil production. The National Iranian South Oil Company operates the field, as well as a number of other fields in the surrounding regions. The field is estimated to contain 6.5 billion barrels of oil. So far 367 wells were drilled in the field, of which only 16 are currently operational. The field is owned by National Iranian Oil Company (NIOC).

See also

List of oil fields

References

Oil fields of Iran